Nazar Vyacheslavovich Chepurnyi (born 3 September 2002) is a Ukrainian artistic gymnast. He participated in the 2018 Summer Youth Olympics and the 2019 Junior World Artistic Gymnastics Championships.

Career

Junior

2016 
Chepurnyi competed at the junior European Championships held in Bern, Switzerland.

2018 
Chepurnyi competed at the Ukraine International Cup where he placed first in the all-around.  He competed at the junior European Championships alongside Illia Kovtun, Vladyslav Hrynevych, Dmytro Shyshko, and Roman Vashchenko where he helped Ukraine finish fifth as a team; he finished ninth in the all-around.  Chepurnyi next competed at Gymnasiade in Marrakesh.  He finished second in the all-around behind Diogo Soares and third on rings but won the gold medal on horizontal bar. He also won the bronze medal in the rings and the silver medal in the all-around event.

Chepurnyi was selected to represent Ukraine at the 2018 Youth Olympic Games.  He was part of the mixed multi-discipline team that won gold.  He qualified to four individual finals: the all-around, floor exercise, vault, and parallel bars.  He finished sixth in the all-around and fourth on both floor exercise and parallel bars.  He won the silver medal on vault behind Brandon Briones.

2019 
Chepurnyi competed at the Ukraine International Cup and the Ukrainian Championships where he finished second in the all-around behind Illia Kovtun.  He was selected to compete at the inaugural junior World Championships in Győr alongside Kovtun and Volodymyr Kostiuk.  While there Chepurnyi helped Ukraine finish second behind Japan and individually he placed seventh in the all-around.  He qualified to three event finals: floor exercise, parallel bars, and horizontal bar.  He won the bronze on floor exercise behind Ryu Sung-hyun and Félix Dolci, finished seventh on parallel bars, and won the gold medal on the horizontal bar. He next competed at the European Youth Olympic Festival in Baku, Azerbaijan.  He, alongside Kovtun and Kostiuk, won the gold medal in the team competition.  Chepurnyi placed sixth in the all-around and fourth on vault but won three individual medals: gold on floor exercise and pommel horse and silver on rings behind Mukhammadzhon Iakubov.

Senior

2021 
Chepurnyi competed at the World Challenge Cups in Varna and Cairo.  He won the gold medal on vault at each and also won a bronze medal on pommel horse in Cairo.  He ended up winning the 2020–2021 series title on vault.  Chepurnyi was selected to compete at the World Championships; he qualified to the vault final in first place.  However, during the event final he crashed his second vault and finished seventh.

2022 
Chepurnyi competed at the Cottbus World Cup in February.  On the first day of qualifications Russia launched a full-scale invasion of Chepurnyi's home country of Ukraine.  Despite news of the war he won silver on vault behind Artur Davtyan.  Chepurnyi next competed at the Doha World Cup where he once again won silver on vault behind Davtyan.  At the Cairo World Cup Chepurnyi won his third consecutive silver medal on vault behind Davtyan.  Chepurnyi finished the World Cup circuit competing at the Baku World Cup where he won his long awaited gold on vault.

Competitive history

References

External links 
 
 

Living people
2002 births
Place of birth missing (living people)
Ukrainian male artistic gymnasts
Gymnasts at the 2018 Summer Youth Olympics
Medalists at the Junior World Artistic Gymnastics Championships
Sportspeople from Cherkasy